Sarab-e Sandal (also Romanized as Sarāb-e Şandal and Sarāb-e Sandal) is a village in Honam Rural District, located in the Central District of Selseleh County, Lorestan Province, Iran. At the 2006 census, it was home to 14 families and had a total population of 55.

References 

Towns and villages in Selseleh County